A statue of Mickey Mantle is installed outside Oklahoma City's Chickasaw Bricktown Ballpark, in the U.S. state of Oklahoma.

See also
 Statue of Mickey Mantle (Commerce, Oklahoma)

External links
 
 Mickey Mantle Statue #2 at Roadside America
 Mickey Mantle Statue #2 - Chickasaw Bricktown Ballpark - Oklahoma City, OK at Waymarking

Baseball culture
Bricktown, Oklahoma City
Monuments and memorials in Oklahoma
Outdoor sculptures in Oklahoma City
Sculptures of men in Oklahoma
Statues in Oklahoma
Statues of sportspeople
Cultural depictions of baseball players
Cultural depictions of American men